A Thousand Words is a 2012 American comedy-drama film directed by Brian Robbins from a script by Steve Koren and starring Eddie Murphy. It was released in theaters on March 9, 2012, four years after it was filmed, to negative reviews from critics, receiving a 0% rating on review aggregator Rotten Tomatoes. It was a box office bomb, having grossed just $22 million worldwide on a $40 million budget.

Plot 
Literary agent Jack McCall uses his "gift of gab" to get various book deals, and he is not afraid to stretch the truth to get them. While he is trying to get a deal from New Age self-help guru Dr. Sinja, he sees through Jack's deceit and agrees to the deal, only to later deliver a five-page book.

That night, a Bodhi Tree appears in Jack's backyard. Dr. Sinja goes to his house and they discover that for every word Jack speaks, a leaf falls off of the tree. When the tree runs out of leaves, it will die, as will Jack. He finds that even written words and gestures towards words count towards his limit; plus anything that happens to the tree also affects him. When Jack tries to cut it down with an axe, a wound appears on him. When squirrels climb the tree, it tickles him. When a gardener tries to poison it with DDT, Jack gets high on the fumes and when the gardener tries to water it, Jack starts to sweat and perspire profusely.

With Jack forced to choose his words carefully, communication becomes difficult and full of misunderstandings. These cost him two book deals, his job, his wife Caroline and his son, Tyler. She walks out on him when she thinks his sudden silence is due to him not loving her anymore. When he tries to explain the tree to her, she doesn't believe him. Only Jack's assistant Aaron Weisberger realizes he is telling the truth, and goes to his house to keep track of how many leaves remain. Jack tries to break the curse by being a better person by giving food to the homeless, and donating some of his money to charity, but that plan fails. Jack drinks a lot of alcohol in the night, causing him to sing a lot, thus making the tree lose most of its leaves. Only when Aaron confronts him and tackles him to the ground does he stop speaking and fall asleep.

With his life falling apart and the tree running out of leaves, Jack confronts Dr. Sinja and asks how to end the curse. The guru tells him to make peace in all of his relationships. With just one branch of leaves left, Jack tries to reconcile with his wife, but she remains hesitant. He visits his mother Annie, who lives in an assisted-living center and has dementia. Annie tells Jack, who she thinks is his late father Raymond, that she wishes Jack would stop being angry at his father for walking out on them when he was a kid. Realizing this is the relationship that needs the most mending, he goes to visit his father's grave. Jack expends the last three leaves of the tree with the words "I forgive you". With no leaves remaining, he suffers a heart attack in a storm and appears to die. Aaron then calls Jack on his cell phone. Still alive, Jack answers his phone. Aaron tells him the tree's leaves have magically reappeared and Jack can now talk freely again.

Jack and Caroline get back together, with him buying the family-friendly house Caroline had asked for, with the tree in their front yard. Although he does not get his job back (Aaron was promoted to Jack's old position), he writes a book about his experience, called A Thousand Words, and gets Aaron to make the deal. Unfortunately for Aaron, the promotion causes him to be like Jack was, thus he gets his own smaller office Bodhi Tree.

Cast

Production 
A Thousand Words was filmed in August 2008 in Los Angeles, California and was supposed to be released in 2009,  but was repeatedly delayed after being caught up in the separation of DreamWorks Pictures from Paramount Pictures and Viacom. During an interview for Fred: The Movie, director Brian Robbins stated that the film would be released in 2011. Reshoots were done on the film early in 2011.

The film was then scheduled for a January 2012 release, but after Murphy was announced as the host of the 2012 Oscar ceremony (he later stepped down), the film was given a date of March 23, 2012; this was later pushed to April 20, 2012, before being pushed up to its eventual release date of March 9, 2012.

Plans for a British release date of June 8, 2012, were cancelled due to unidentified difficulties, and the film was instead released direct-to-DVD in the UK on July 16, 2012.

Release

Box office 
A Thousand Words grossed $18,450,127 in North America, along with $3,594,150 in other countries, for a worldwide total of $22,044,277, against an estimated production budget of $40 million.

In the United States. The film along with John Carter and Silent House was expected to gross $5 million on its opening weekend. The film made $1.9 million on Friday and it ended up debuting at sixth with a $6.1 million on its opening weekend.

Reception
On Rotten Tomatoes, the film has an approval rating of 0% based on 57 reviews, with an average rating of 3.1/10. The site's critical consensus reads, "Dated jokes (A Thousand Words was shot in 2008) and removing Eddie Murphy's voice – his greatest comedic asset – dooms this painful mess from the start." The site also gave the film their "Moldy Tomato" award for the worst-reviewed film of 2012. On Metacritic, the film has a score of 26 out of 100, based on 18 critics, indicating "generally unfavorable reviews". Audiences polled by CinemaScore gave the film an average grade of "B−" on an A+ to F scale.

Frank Scheck of The Hollywood Reporter calls the film another example of "how the talented performer’s poor choice of material continually undercuts him". Although Scheck praises Murphy's efforts he concludes "The formulaic script by Steve Koren doesn't manage to exploit the absurd premise with any discernible wit or invention, and the star is left floundering." Roger Ebert of the Chicago Sun-Times gave the film 1.5 out of 4 and wrote: "The poster art for A Thousand Words shows Eddie Murphy with duct tape over his mouth, which as a promotional idea ranks right up there with Fred Astaire in leg irons." Ebert is also critical of the plot because it "never explains the rules".
Justin Chang of Variety wrote: "Alas, even Murphy's largely wordless, physically adroit performance can't redeem this tortured exercise in high-concept spiritualist hokum."

Andrew Pulver of The Guardian commented, "Everyone, it seems, is united by A Thousand Words awfulness."

Accolades 
A Thousand Words was nominated for three Golden Raspberry Awards, but received none of them.

 33rd Golden Raspberry Awards
 Worst Picture (lost to The Twilight Saga: Breaking Dawn – Part 2)
 Worst Actor (Eddie Murphy) (lost to Adam Sandler for That's My Boy)
 Worst Screenplay (Steve Koren) (lost to David Caspe for That's My Boy)

References

External links 
 
 
 

2012 films
American comedy-drama films
2012 comedy-drama films
Films directed by Brian Robbins
Paramount Pictures films
DreamWorks Pictures films
Films about trees
Films scored by John Debney
Saturn Films films
Films produced by Nicolas Cage
2010s English-language films
2010s American films